Coleophora parapredotella is a moth of the family Coleophoridae. It is found in Afghanistan.

References

parapredotella
Moths of Asia
Moths described in 1967